Martin Vráblík (born 4 July 1982 in Vsetín, Czechoslovakia (now Czech Republic)) is a Czech alpine skier. Vráblík has appeared in the 2006 Winter Olympics and at the 2003, 2005 and 2007 World Championships. He has also appeared in some World Cup races, with negligible success.

Career

Olympic Games

2006
 Slalom – 21st
 Giant slalom – DNF
 Super-G – 38th
 Combined – 12th

World Championship finishes
2005 – Men's slalom, 26th position
2003 – Men's downhill, 40th position

World Cup
He made his World Cup debut in 2004 in Wengen, and since this date his best result is 23rd, on 12 December 2008 in Val-d'Isère.

References

External links
 
 

1982 births
Czech male alpine skiers
Alpine skiers at the 2006 Winter Olympics
Alpine skiers at the 2010 Winter Olympics
Alpine skiers at the 2014 Winter Olympics
Olympic alpine skiers of the Czech Republic
Universiade medalists in alpine skiing
People from Vsetín
Living people
Universiade gold medalists for the Czech Republic
Competitors at the 2005 Winter Universiade
Competitors at the 2007 Winter Universiade
Sportspeople from the Zlín Region